Diversity Day can refer to:
World Day for Cultural Diversity for Dialogue and Development
 Unity in Diversity Day at New Paltz (village), New York  
"Diversity Day" (The Office), a Season One episode of the sitcom The Office